Kenneth Todd Freeman (born July 9, 1965) is an American actor. He has been nominated for two Tony Awards over the course of his career and has won one Drama Desk Award. He has played supporting roles in films such as Grosse Pointe Blank (1997) and The Cider House Rules (1999), played a prominent recurring role on Buffy the Vampire Slayer (1998–1999), and was a series regular on A Series of Unfortunate Events (2017–2019).

Life and career
Born in Houston, Texas, Freeman went to the local High School for the Performing and Visual Arts before later graduating from the University of North Carolina School of the Arts in 1987.

Freeman has been an ensemble member of the Steppenwolf Theatre Company in Chicago, Illinois since 1993. In the same year, he was nominated for the Tony Award for Best Actor in a Play for his lead performance in the Apartheid drama The Song of Jacob Zulu. More recently, Freeman has played the role of Doctor Dillamond from Wicked in the first North American tour, Chicago and Broadway productions. In 2015, he was nominated for his second Tony Award, this time for Best Featured Actor in a Play as Sissy Na Na in Airline Highway. He won the Drama Desk Award for Outstanding Featured Actor in a Play for the same role.

He has also had supporting roles in various films such as Eraser (1996), Grosse Pointe Blank (1997), The Cider House Rules (1999), and The Dark Knight (2008). On television, he earned a recurring role on Buffy the Vampire Slayer as Mr. Trick.

He performed in the Steppenwolf Theatre Company's production of Downstate, which concluded its run on November 18, 2018.

He portrayed Mr. Poe in the 2017 Netflix comedy drama series A Series of Unfortunate Events.

Work

Theatre

Film

Television

Awards and nominations

Theatre

References

External links

1965 births
Living people
American male film actors
21st-century American male actors
African-American male actors
Male actors from Houston
American male stage actors
Drama Desk Award winners
American male television actors
20th-century American male actors
University of North Carolina School of the Arts alumni
High School for the Performing and Visual Arts alumni
Steppenwolf Theatre Company players
20th-century African-American people
21st-century African-American people